Marc Zimmer (born July 26, 1961) is the Jean Tempel '65 Professor of Professor of Chemistry at Connecticut College. He has published seven books, written articles on science and medicine for the Los Angeles Times, USA Today, the Huffington Post, etc. He has been interviewed or quoted in the Economist, Science, Nature etc.

Zimmer curates the  GFP website, tweets about GFP (@lightUpScience) and he has published over 60 research papers about cow flatulence, computational chemistry and bioluminescence in fireflies and jellyfish. Zimmer is the initiator and director of the Connecticut College Science Leaders program, a program to increase the number of women and minority students graduating from the college with a degree and research experience in the sciences.

Boards, awards, etc 
 2020 longlist AAAS/Subaru SB&F Prize for Excellence in Middle Grades Science Books
 Guest on NPR's "Where we Live" show about bioluminescence 
 Professor, Semester at Sea, Spring ’12 and Summer '13 voyages
 ACS Western Connecticut Visiting Scientist Award for 2013
 The Princeton Review's 'Best 300 Professors', 2012
 Huffington Post’s one of "13 of the best college professors in the country", 2012
 Carnegie Foundation and Council for Advancement and Support of Education, Connecticut, Professor of the Year, 2007
 John S. Burlew Connecticut Valley Section Award to recognize outstanding contributions to chemistry, 2005
 Program Chair, Inorganic Division, American Chemical Society, 1999-2003

Bibliography

Books
 “Glowing Genes: A Revolution in Biotechnology.” Prometheus Books, Amherst, New York, 2005..
 “光る遺伝子 オワンクラゲと緑色蛍光タンパク質GFP (単行本).” Maruzen Publishers, Tokyo, 2009..
 “Illuminating Disease.” Oxford University Press, New York, 2015.
 "Solutions for a Cleaner, Greener Planet: Environmental Chemistry." Twenty First Century Books, Minneapolis, 2019.
 “Bioluminescence Nature and Science at Work.” Twenty First Century Books, Minneapolis, 2016.
 "Lighting Up the Brain: The Science of Optogenetics." Twenty First Century Books, Minneapolis, 2018.
 "発光する生物の謎 (生命ふしぎ図鑑)." Nishimura Shoten, Matsusaka, 2017.
 "Solutions for a Cleaner, Greener Planet: Environmental Chemistry." Twenty First Century Books, Minneapolis, 2019.
 "The State of Science: What the Future Holds and the Scientists Making It Happen." Prometheus Books, 2020.
 "Science and the Skeptic: Discerning Fact from Fiction." Twenty First Century Books, Minneapolis, 2022.

Recent articles
  “A Colorful Answer To Pregnancy Puzzle. A Eureka Moment For Chemists: Answer Found In Fruit Fly Poop.” M. Zimmer Hartford Courant, February 6, 2011.
 “Optogenetics: Three not-so-blind (anymore) mice” M. Zimmer Providence Journal, May 7, 2011.
 “Lighting Up Chickens to Prevent Bird Flu Pandemics” Huffington Post, November 28, 2012.
 “Dengue Fever vs. Glowing Mosquitoes” USA Today, February 22, 2013.
 “Luminescent Eel Muscles Fluorescent Protein Revolution into Clinic.” Huffington Post, June 18, 2013.
 “Mending Broken Hearts: Using Embryonic Stem Cells to Repair the Damage Caused by Heart Attacks.” Huffington Post, May 9, 2014.
 "6 tips to help you detect fake science news" The Conversation, March 15, 2021.
 "From CRISPR to glowing proteins to optogenetics – scientists’ most powerful technologies have been borrowed from nature." The Conversation, August 5, 2021.
 "AI makes huge progress predicting how proteins fold – one of biology’s greatest challenges – promising rapid drug development." The Conversation, December 2, 2020.

References

External links 
 Marc Zimmer's personal homepage
 Marc Zimmer's GFP homepage
 Surfing the fluorescent wave - a GFP TED-X talk

1961 births
Living people
American science writers
South African chemists
Connecticut College faculty
University of the Witwatersrand alumni
Worcester Polytechnic Institute alumni
Computational chemists